Bridel is a town in the commune of Kopstal in central Luxembourg.

Bridel may also refer to:
 an old-English word for bridle
 Bridel (surname)
 a French dairy product trade mark owned by Lactalis